Amanda Jayne Maslin-Barr (born 2 May 1982) is an English football striker She scored ten goals in 37 appearances for the England women's national football team after making her international debut in 2001. Barr spearheaded the England attack at the 2005 UEFA Women's Championship, hosted in her native North West. She married former Lincoln City, Nottingham Forest and Sheffield Wednesday goalkeeper Daniella (Danni) Maslin in December 2014 and changed her name to Maslin - Barr. She now has a Son named Noah Thomas Maslin-Barr and is The Director and Founder of RTB Development

Club career
Maslin-Barr attended Avondale High School and began her career with six years at local team Stockport County. Following spells with Everton Ladies and Doncaster Belles, she was awarded the National Division Golden Boot in 2003, after scoring 17 goals in 17 league games for Charlton Athletic. She also scored three goals in helping the team advance to the FA Cup final that season. She scored another 18 goals the following season (2003–04), when Charlton finished runners up in the league to Arsenal.

Barr then signed for Birmingham City alongside England teammates Jo Fletcher, Alex Scott and Rachel Yankey. But after one season Birmingham experienced a funding crisis and Maslin-Barr returned to Charlton.

In the summer of 2006, Maslin-Barr joined newly promoted Blackburn Rovers and was made captain in September. She signed for Leeds United in January 2007.

In July 2008 Maslin-Barr signed with the OOH Lincoln Ladies. She scored 16 goals in her first season, but left when the club failed to win promotion from the Northern Division. After a spell training with Leeds Carnegie she returned to OOH Lincoln a few weeks later, but missed most of 2009–10 with a back injury.

At the start of the 2010–11 season, new Preston North End Women manager Andy Burgess signed Maslin-Barr for The Lilywhites, as he sought to build a squad capable of winning promotion to the National Premier Division. Maslin-Barr switched to Northern Combination outfit Sheffield Wednesday Women in February 2011.

International career
After scoring 11 goals in 18 appearances at U-18 level, Barr made her first England start on 1 March 2002 in a 3-1 Algarve Cup defeat to Norway. She scored her first goal four days later in a 6–3 loss to Sweden. Barr had won her first senior cap as a late substitute in a 1–0 win over Scotland at Reebok Stadium in May 2001.

Maslin-Barr played at Euro 2005, scoring England's second goal in their opening 3-2 group stage win over Finland.

International goals
Scores and results list England's goal tally first.

Personal life

Barr was among the first players who won a scholarship to the national player development centre at Loughborough University. Her nickname is "Munch".

References

English women's footballers
Everton F.C. (women) players
Doncaster Rovers Belles L.F.C. players
Charlton Athletic W.F.C. players
Birmingham City W.F.C. players
Blackburn Rovers L.F.C. players
Leeds United Women F.C. players
Notts County L.F.C. players
England women's international footballers
FA Women's National League players
1982 births
Living people
Alumni of Loughborough University
Women's association football forwards
Nottingham Forest Women F.C. players
Fylde Ladies F.C. players
Stockport County L.F.C. players